Ruthellen Josselson is professor of clinical psychology at The Fielding Graduate University and a psychotherapist in practice.

Work
She was formerly a professor at The Hebrew University of Jerusalem and Towson University, a visiting professor at Harvard University and a visiting fellow at Cambridge University. Her research focuses on women's identity and on human relationships. She received the Henry A. Murray Award,  the Theodore R. Sarbin Award and the Distinguished Contributions to Qualitative Research Award from the American Psychological Association as well as a Fulbright Fellowship. She has been active in group relations work for many years, consults to organizations, and lectures and conducts workshops both nationally and internationally. She is co-Director of the Irvin D. Yalom Institute of Psychotherapy. Dr. Josselson was a founder of the Society of Qualitative Inquiry. and is the editor of the APA journal Qualitative Psychology.

Education
She received her Ph.D. in clinical psychology in 1972 from the University of Michigan.

Books published
Josselson is the author of numerous books, among them: Paths to Fulfillment: Women's Search for Meaning and Identity; Playing Pygmalion: How People Create One Another; Revising Herself: The Story of Women's Identity from College to Midlife (which received the Delta Kappa Gamma Educators Award); Irvin D. Yalom: On Psychotherapy and the Human Condition;  The Space Between Us: Exploring the Dimensions of Human Relationships; and Interviewing for Qualitative Research. She was, for many years, co-editor of the annual, The Narrative Study of Lives.

External links
 www.ruthellenjosselson.com
 www.amazon.com/Ruthellen-Josselson/e/B001H9TAQ8
 http://www.epsilen.com/rjosselson

References

Living people
American psychotherapists
Towson University faculty
University of Michigan alumni
Year of birth missing (living people)